Bradwall is a civil parish in Cheshire East, England.  It contains three buildings that are recorded in the National Heritage List for England as designated listed buildings, all of which are at Grade II.  This grade is the lowest of the three gradings given to listed buildings and is applied to "buildings of national importance and special interest".  The parish is entirely rural.  The listed buildings consist of a farmhouse, buildings associated with a former hall, and a former reformatory school and farm.

See also
Listed buildings in Middlewich
Listed buildings in Moston
Listed buildings in Sandbach
Listed buildings in Brereton
Listed buildings in Sproston

References

Listed buildings in the Borough of Cheshire East
Lists of listed buildings in Cheshire